Henning Harnisch (born April 15, 1968) is a retired German professional basketball player. At a height of 2.03 m (6 ft 8 in) tall, he played at the small forward and power forward positions. He currently serves as Vice president for the German Basketball Bundesliga team Alba Berlin, and is in charge of Alba's youth program. In addition to that, he is the China ambassador for Alba Berlin.

Professional career
Harnisch played professional basketball for the German Basketball Bundesliga teams Gießen 46ers, Bayer Giants Leverkusen, and Alba Berlin. From 1990 to 1998, Harnisch won 9 German Basketball Championships in a row (7 with Leverkusen and 2 with Berlin), a record that has not yet been broken. Furthermore, Harnisch also won 5 German Cups (4 with Leverkusen and 1 with Berlin). Because of his spectacular slam dunks, Harnisch was known throughout his playing career, as the Flying Henning.

German national team
As a member of the senior German national basketball team, Harnisch competed at the 1992 Summer Olympics, four EuroBaskets, and one FIBA World Cup. He was a member of the team that won Germany's only Gold Medal, at the 1993 EuroBasket.

References

External links
FIBA Profile
FIBA Europe Profile

1968 births
Living people
Alba Berlin players
Basketball players at the 1992 Summer Olympics
Bayer Giants Leverkusen players
German men's basketball players
Giessen 46ers players
Olympic basketball players of Germany
Sportspeople from Marburg
Power forwards (basketball)
Small forwards
1994 FIBA World Championship players